Jurgen Dushkaj (born 9 June 1995) is an Albanian footballer free agent who most recently played as a midfielder for Luftëtari in the Kategoria Superiore.

Career

Luftëtari
In August 2019, Dushkaj returned to his native Albania, signing with Luftëtari in the Albanian Superliga. He made his league debut for the club on 24 August 2019, playing the entirety of a 3–0 away defeat to KF Tirana.

References

External links

1995 births
Living people
KS Ada Velipojë players
AFC Dacia Unirea Brăila players
Luftëtari Gjirokastër players
Kategoria e Parë players
Liga II players
Kategoria Superiore players
Albanian footballers
Albanian expatriate footballers
Association football midfielders